Oleksianka  is a village in the administrative district of Gmina Latowicz, within Mińsk County, Masovian Voivodeship, in east-central Poland.

References

Oleksianka